Tanya Denise Wilson (born June 13, 1950) is an American beauty pageant titleholder who was crowned Miss USA 1972. Wilson had previously been crowned Miss Hawaii USA 1972, and placed in the top twelve at Miss Universe 1972, where she represented the United States.

Born in Reno, Nevada, Wilson began her pageantry career competing for Miss Nevada in 1969 and 1970, placing as a runner-up. Wilson later moved to Honolulu, Hawaii with her mother and began attending the University of Hawaii. She was later crowned Miss Hawaii USA 1972, earning the right to represent Hawaii at Miss USA 1972 in Dorado, Puerto Rico. She went on to win the title, becoming the second woman from Hawaii to win Miss USA.

As Miss USA, Wilson represented the United States at Miss Universe 1972 in Dorado, where she placed in the top twelve. She finished her reign as Miss USA after crowning Amanda Jones of Illinois as Miss USA 1973.

At the time of her Miss Hawaii USA win, Wilson was a senior at the University of Hawaii studying physical education, and was set to graduate the weekend after Miss USA. She had planned to become engaged to her boyfriend after her graduation, but was forced to defer the engagement after winning the title.  She and her fiancé intended to marry in June 1973 after passing on her title.

References

External links

Miss USA official website

1950 births
American beauty pageant winners
Living people
Miss Universe 1972 contestants
Miss USA winners
People from Honolulu
People from Reno, Nevada
University of Hawaiʻi alumni